Marcela Krinke-Susmelj (born 18 October 1965 in Vlašim, Czechoslovakia) is a Czech-born Swiss Olympics dressage rider. She participated at the 2016 Summer Olympics in Rio de Janeiro, Brazil, where she placed 24th in the individual competition.

Krinke-Susmelj also competed at three editions of World Equestrian Games (2006, 2010 and 2014), six European Dressage Championships (2005, 2007, 2011, 2013, 2015 and 2017) and four World Cup Finals (2013, 2014, 2016 and 2017). Her current best championship results are two 8th places in team dressage competitions (from the 2005 Europeans and the 2006 Worlds), while her current best individual result is 11th place in freestyle dressage from the 2010 World Equestrian Games.

She is married to the former Yugoslav dressage champion Ivan Susmelj and has two children.

Personal bests

References

Living people
1965 births
Swiss female equestrians
Swiss dressage riders
People from Vlašim
Equestrians at the 2016 Summer Olympics
Olympic equestrians of Switzerland